This is a list of the winners of the so-called "Big Four" film critics' awards, consisting of the four most prestigious American film critics' awards: those of the Los Angeles Film Critics Association, the National Board of Review, the National Society of Film Critics, and the New York Film Critics' Circle. As of 2023, only three films have won all four including Schindler's List (the only film to have won the Academy Award for Best Picture), L.A. Confidential, and The Social Network, all of which are based on novels. Additionally, only six people have won all four and three most prestigious annual awards Oscar, Golden Globe, and BAFTA for every single film including Emma Thompson (1992's Howards End), Holly Hunter (1993's The Piano), Alexander Payne and Jim Taylor (2004's Sideways), Forest Whitaker (2006's The Last King of Scotland), and Helen Mirren (2006's The Queen).

Films with all wins from "Big Four"

Best Film

Best Director

Best Actor

Best Actress

Best Supporting Actor

Best Supporting Actress

Best Screenplay 
National Board of Review for Best Screenplay was initially began in 1998.

Best Documentary or Non-fiction Film

Other films with three wins from "Big Four" 
These films won all three out of four awards for the American film critics' awards;

Best Film

Best Director

Best Actor

Best Actress

Best Supporting Actor

Best Supporting Actress

Best Screenplay

Best Foreign Language Film

Best Documentary / Non-fiction Film

Best Cinematography 
National Board of Review Award for Outstanding Achievement in Cinematography was introduced in 2019, inaugurate the winner of Roger Deakins in 1917 (2019)

Three critics' awards 
Awards in the categories of Best Animated Film, Best Cinematography, and Best Screenplay are each only awarded by three of the four groups.

Best Animated Film 
There are some lists who have won Los Angeles Film Critics Association Award for Best Animated Film, National Board of Review Award for Best Animated Film, and New York Film Critics Circle Award for Best Animated Film. Started in 2000, NBR for Best Animated Film was announced, inaugurate the winner of Aardman's Chicken Run (2000).

Best Cinematography (formerly) 
There are several lists who have won Los Angeles Film Critics Association Award for Best Cinematography, National Society of Film Critics Award for Best Cinematography, and New York Film Critics Circle Award for Best Cinematography from 1980 until 2019, National Board of Review Award for Outstanding Achievement in Cinematography was introduced as part of the "Big Four".

Milestones and records

People 

 In three critics' awards, there are three cinematographers who have won both Oscar and BAFTA for Best Cinematography; Chris Menges, Janusz Kamiński, and Alfonso Cuarón.
 Steven Soderbergh is the only director to have won all four while received Oscar for Best Director nominations in two films, Erin Brockovich and Traffic, which the latter won.

Films 

 Schindler's List is the only film to ever sweep both, all those for Best Picture category.
 Man on Wire is the only documentary film to win both Oscar for Best Documentary Feature and "Big Four".
 In three critics' awards, Spirited Away (2002) and The Incredibles (2004) are the only two animated films to have won the Academy Award for Best Animated Feature.
 Drive My Car became the first non-English-language film to considered the best film of the year from all three major U.S. critics groups (LAFCA, NYFCC, NSFC).

See also 
 List of Big Five Academy Award winners and nominees

Notes 
 ≈ Oscar winner
 ≠ Oscar nominee

References 

American film awards
International film awards
Lists of films by award
American film critics associations
Los Angeles Film Critics Association Awards
National Board of Review Awards
National Society of Film Critics Awards
New York Film Critics Circle Awards